

Players

Competitions

Division Four

League table

Results summary

League position by match

Matches

FA Cup

Milk Cup

Freight Rover Trophy

Appearances and goals

References

Books

1985-86
Northampton Town